is a fictional character and the main protagonist in Koyoharu Gotouge's manga Demon Slayer: Kimetsu no Yaiba. Tanjiro goes on a quest to restore the humanity of his sister, Nezuko, who was turned into a demon after his family was killed by Muzan Kibutsuji following an attack that resulted in the death of his other relatives. After an encounter with Giyu Tomioka, a demon slayer, Tanjiro is recruited by Giyu to also become a demon slayer to help his sister turn human again and avenge his family. Besides Ufotable's Demon Slayer: Kimetsu no Yaiba anime adaptation, Tanjiro has also appeared in a light novel that acts as a prequel to the manga.
 
Gotouge created Tanjiro following a suggestion from their editor of having a bright main character who would stand out in his dark narrative. His design was influenced by Himura Kenshin from Nobuhiro Watsuki's manga Rurouni Kenshin when deciding how androgynous the character should look. The character is primarily voiced by Natsuki Hanae in Japanese and Zach Aguilar in English.

The character has been well received by manga and anime critics due to his caring nature and relationship with his sister while also becoming a strong fighter. This has led to the character winning multiple awards with Hanae's performance as him also receiving one. Aguilar's performance was also well-received.

Creation and design

Tanjiro Kamado originates from Koyoharu Gotouge's ideas involving a one-shot with Japanese motifs. Tatsuhiko Katayama, their editor, was worried about the one-shot crusade being too dark for the young demographic and asked Gotouge if they could write another type of the main character who would be "brighter". Gotouge has cited issues in the making of the character due to the contrast he has with the dark narrative. For the release of the manga's seventh chapter, Gotouge drew a cover of Tanjiro wielding his sword while smiling. However, due to the contrasting aesthetics the manga had, they discarded the drawing and instead drew a similar design with Tanjiro having a serious expression.

In the initial design, Tanjiro did not have a scar or wear earrings, but in the end, they felt these features accentuated the character. In the making of the cast, Tanjiro had four supporting characters who would balance each other due to their different skills. The editor commented about Tanjiro, "[He] is a type of male main character that you don't see much. He's so kind. He has Nezuko, so he's coming from this position where he can't just say all demons are absolute evil. He's in the gray zone." Tanjiro's design was also influenced by Gotouge's editor: he suggested giving Tanjiro a facial scar in his forehead inspired by Himura Kenshin from Nobuhiro Watsuki's manga Rurouni Kenshin while also giving him earrings to balance how androgynous he would look.

Yuma Takahashi, the producer behind the adaptation of the manga said he enjoyed Tanjiro's role in the manga, making him engaged in reading the series. For how Tanjiro's Water Breathing was portrayed, Ufotable received inspiration from Katsushika Hokusai's ukiyo-e style. The first fight scene between Tanjiro and Giyu was also carefully animated to give viewers an appealing choreography. Tanjiro's water-based techniques were created using a mix between hand-drawn animation and CGI, while his battle against Rui was one of the most worked scenes in the making. Takahashi also said that Tanjiro is his most relatable character from the series due to how his constant hard work inspires him. The anime uses an insert theme song titled "Kamado Tanjiro no Uta" It expresses the determination of the Tanjiro, who stands up from despair and struggles to protect his younger sister.

When the anime series premiered in China, Tanjiro's design was slightly altered. Due to his piercings having Rising Sun style elements, it was feared it would offend the Mainland leading to brief retouches to them.

Voice actors
Tanjiro has been voiced by Natsuki Hanae in Japanese. Hanae noted that multiple responses to his career involved him portraying sad characters. However, in Tanjiro's case, he said Tanjiro is on the easy side because he says what he thinks, and is not the type that thinks one way and other things. Nezuko's actress, Akari Kitō, said Hanae is like a big brother to her at the studio, supportive and if there are parts she has difficulty recording, Hanae would stay and wait till she finishes even though his part has finished. Hanae said he also thinks of Kitō as a younger sister. He also says it is easier for him to do his best when he is around people with whom he is friendly. Tanjiro's fighting style was liked by Hanae who reported he often made Tanjiro's shouts when playing video games. He appreciated the feedback he was given by the viewers of the anime.

English voice actor Zach Aguilar was overjoyed when being given the role of voicing Tanjiro in the dub due to him being a fan of the series, as well as noting he was supported by multiple fans. In another news, Aguilar ended liking the character as well as his fellow companions, wishing to find merchandising of Tanjiro. Allegra Clark voices Tanjiro as an infant. Clark admitted she became emotional during the recording of the series and liked the younger incarnation of the character.

Appearances

In Demon Slayer: Kimetsu no Yaiba
The main protagonist of Demon Slayer, Tanjiro Kamado is the oldest son of a late charcoal-seller, Tanjuro. In the first chapter of the manga, his family is massacred by a demon named Muzan Kibutsuji, with only his sister Nezuko Kamado surviving only to become a demon. After seeing Tanjiro's skills in battle as well as Nezuko's unwillingness to devour her brother, Giyu Tomioka sends the siblings to Sakonji Urokodaki on Mt. Sagiri in order to become a demon slayer. Tanjiro vows to save his sister, and sets the theme from the manga: "Muzan Kibutsuji! No matter where you go, I promise you won't escape me! You can run as far as you want! I'll follow you to the ends of Hell, and my blade will be the last thing you see! I'll never forgive you for what you've done!"

After a couple of years of training his body and learning swordsmanship with ghosts, which he will find out later, Tanjiro learns the  sword-style. After passing a test, Tanjiro becomes a member of the Demon Slayer Corps. During his first days as a Demon Slayer, Tanjiro manages to make contact with Muzan but the demon turns a human into one of his own to distract him. As this happens, Muzan becomes interested by Tanjiro's taunts and Hanafuda earrings from the Rising Sun, ordering his forces to kill the child. The siblings later meet friendly demons named Tamayo and Yushiro and assist with their research to find a way to restore Nezuko's humanity. As a result, Tanjiro starts collecting samples of blood from the demons he vanquishes, the stronger the better.

Later in his battle with the demon Rui, Tanjiro remembers Tanjuro's family dance which his father wanted him to pass on his next generation alongside his rising sun earrings. After the Demon Slayer superiors accept him to continue working despite Nezuko's true nature, Tanjiro starts seeking the origins of his Hinokami and whether or not his Tanjuro was related with such group of slayers. His sword's color is black, occasionally turning crimson red and becoming much stronger when combined with Nezuko's Blood Burst, a technique he later learns to perform without her help.

With the Upper Ranks defeated, the Demon Slayers join forces in the final battle against Muzan. Tanjiro is poisoned by the enemy and at the brink of death he has a vision of one of his ancestors and his encounter with Yoriichi Tsugikuni, who developed the original fighting style which was passed along the generations of the Kamado family in the form of the Hinokami Kagura. Tanjiro reawakens and with the knowledge he obtained during his vision, leads the counterattack against the enemy. Meanwhile, Nezuko, certain that her brother needs her help, rushes to join his side. The medicine developed to cure her demon condition works, turning Nezuko into a human again. Though he eventually avenges his family during the final battle, losing his arm and eye in the process while being fatally wounded, he recovers after Muzan turns him into the ultimate demon before his death. By losing his consciousness in the transformation to the point of attacking his own friends, Tanjiro as a demon becomes a bigger threat than Muzan himself, given that he is immune to sunlight like his sister, until he manages to return to human form, thanks to his friends' efforts, although his right eye, the iris of which is now a dull pink-gray color and the pupil black rather than its original white. His left arm that grew back when he became a demon now takes the appearance of that which an older person may have, becoming wrinkled and skeletal, and he loses all feeling in it below the elbow and thus the ability to move it from his forearm down. After the battle, Tanjiro returns home with his sister and friends. Later it is revealed that he married fellow slayer Kanao Tsuyuri, In the Modern World, Tanjiro and Kanao had descendants named Sumihiko Kamado and Kanata Kamado.

Other appearances
A light novel entitled Demon Slayer: Flower of Happiness chronicles the lives of Tanjiro and Zenitsu before the start of the main series. Merchandising based on Tanjiro has also been released. The character is also playable in the video game Demon Slayer: Kimetsu no Yaiba – The Hinokami Chronicles.

Reception

Popularity
Tanjiro's character has been very popular. He was ranked in 1st place as of the first Demon Slayer character popularity poll with 6,742 votes. Anime! Anime! did a poll in 2020 involving Tanjiro's character. Readers voted his first usage of the fire technique as the best action performed by the character. Meanwhile, his bond with Nezuko was also voted as having one of the best quotes in the manga. In February 2020 at the 4th Crunchyroll Anime Awards, Tanjiro won the "Best Boy" category and the fight of Tanjiro and his sister Nezuko against Rui won the "Best Fight Scene" category. This scene was heavily commented by the critics with IGN regarding it as one of the best television episode series of all times based on the visual and execution. Manga.Tokyo enjoyed the build up to this scene as Nezuko manages to assist Tanjiro. Due to the emotional delivery of this scene, the writer look forward to more interactions between the two siblings.

He won the Newtype Anime Awards for Best Male Character for his role in the series, along with Natsuki Hanae also being awarded for his performance as Tanjiro. According to Comic Book Resources, Tanjiro's hanafuda earring are also highly popular within the fanbase. The same site also made a list of the 10 best quotes the character says in the anime series. He also appeared in TV Time article featuring the best characters from 2019. In a Benesse survey, Tanjiro was voted as the most trusted character by Shinkenzemi Elementary School Course.

In November 2020, Hong Kong police posted an image of its anti-fraud mascot resembling Tanjiro. Hong Kong pro-democracy activist Agnes Chow expressed fears for its similarities with the character, stating that while it is not a copyright violation, he was disappointed by the lack of creative rights.  A card illustrated by Gin Tama author Hideaki Sorachi, depicting Tanjiro and the Hashira, was given to the theatergoers in the film's first week of screenings of Gintama The Final Film. In October 2021, Shueisha failed its appeal to trademark the clothing patterns for the following Demon Slayer including Tanjiro among others.

Critical reception

Critical reception to Tanjiro's character has been positive ever since his introduction. Otaku USA found Tanjiro an anti-stereotypical take from the shōnen main characters due to his desire to fight being solely to find a cure to protect Nezuko, calling him a "fascinating breath of fresh air", while highlighting his friendly personality in a dark story. Anime News Network also liked Tanjiro's design due to how it translates the narrative of his family being poor, while also liking the way the characters lives with them and later only Nezuko. Comic Book Bin felt Tanjiro's journey was inspirational due to the pain he goes to save Nezuko, making him likable. Anime Inferno said "Tanjiro and Nezuko make a great team and are two enjoyable protagonists, with the series at its best when the two siblings are working together." While noting that the character becomes a warrior in the second manga volume, the writer believed he might experience major pain through his quest. Nevertheless, regardless of how many battles he takes, Comic Book Bin enjoyed how Tanjiro retained his caring personality. Anime News Network said that while he keeps being well meaning in following arcs, he still shows a more aggressive side when fighting demons, making him multi-faceted. IGN noted that Tanjiro stands out due to his caring traits, comparing him to Allen Walker from Katsura Hoshino's D.Gray-man series who also exhibits these traits when being faced with the dilemma of hurting an enemy. Tanjiro's relationship with Nezuko was acclaimed by IGN as "one of the most endearing parts of Demon Slayer, if not arguably its beating heart and soul". Fandom Post also liked Tanjiro's care for others even if the other characters he meets are antagonists, with most of them being demons. As a result, Fandom Post believed the writing in the manga made him endearing. Similarly, Manga.Tokyo questioned how would Tanjiro change in his quest due to his need of becoming stronger and whether or not he might reach the happy ending he wants.

In regards to Ufotable's handling of the series, Manga.Tokyo liked his visual appearance, finding it outstanding within the shonen genre, but felt that his struggle with Giyu was harsh, making the main character more likable. Natsuki Hanae's performance as Tanjiro's Japanese voice actor was praised by the reviewer. Nevertheless, the handling of Tanjiro's horror in regards to Nezuko's condition was the subject of praise. The Fandom Post enjoyed Tanjiro's debut in the series due to how Ufotable handled the character's shock upon the tragedy of his family and how he battles Giyu in order to protect his sister. As a result, he sees Tanjiro as a character with potential to be appealing. The Fandom Post enjoyed how skilled Tanjiro became in the manga's tenth volume, making it one of the best reasons to keep following the printed media. The English actor, Zach Aguilar, was also praised for his performance as Tanjiro.

Writing for Comic Book Resources, Sage Ashford praised the protagonists, whom he called "the most likable male and female leads of the decade". Gadget Tsūshin listed both the breathing techniques suffix and "Ah! The era, the era changed again!" in their 2019 anime buzzwords list. Manga.Tokyo felt Tanjiro's characterization to be unique within the series the writer has seen, citing the scenes where the character cheers himself up and tries to work for his responsibilities. Tanjiro's skills in regards to his breathing was noted to be one of the most surprising events in the anime series by Latin America's IGN. In late 2019, IGN wondered about the possibilities of Tanjiro dying in the manga at the hands of Muzan due to the multiple wounds he suffered in his match against the demon.

References

External links
  

Anime and manga characters who can move at superhuman speeds
Anime and manga characters with accelerated healing
Anime and manga characters with superhuman strength
Comics characters introduced in 2016
Crunchyroll Anime Awards winners
Demon Slayer: Kimetsu no Yaiba
Fictional characters who can manipulate sound
Fictional characters with disfigurements
Fictional characters with extrasensory perception
Fictional characters with fire or heat abilities
Fictional characters with immortality
Fictional characters with superhuman durability or invulnerability
Fictional characters with superhuman senses
Fictional characters with water abilities
Fictional demon hunters
Fictional demons and devils
Fictional flexible weapons practitioners
Fictional Japanese people in anime and manga
Fictional kenjutsuka
Fictional male martial artists
Fictional mercenaries in comics
Fictional swordfighters in anime and manga
Fictional yōkai
Male characters in anime and manga
Martial artist characters in anime and manga
Orphan characters in anime and manga
Teenage characters in anime and manga